The Mamaia Challenger was a professional tennis tournament played on outdoor red clay courts. It was part of the ATP Challenger Tour. It was held annually in Constanța, Romania, since 2006 until 2009. The tournament was discontinued in 2010 due to financial reasons.

Past finals

Singles

Doubles

References

External links
Official Romanian Tennis Federation website
ITF Search

ATP Challenger Tour
Clay court tennis tournaments
Tennis tournaments in Romania
Recurring sporting events disestablished in 2010
Recurring sporting events established in 2006
2006 establishments in Romania
2010 disestablishments in Romania